The 1997–98 Midland Football Combination season was the 61st in the history of Midland Football Combination, a football competition in England.

Premier Division

The Premier Division featured 17 clubs which competed in the division last season, along with four new clubs, promoted from Division One:
Cheslyn Hay
Continental Star
Dudley Sports
GPT Coventry

League table

References

1997–98
9